Cacuaco is a city and one of the nine municipalities that make up the province of Luanda. A suburb of the capital, Luanda, it has a population of 1,279,488 (2019).

Administrative divisions
The Municipality of Cacuaco is made up of three communes:
 Cacuaco
 Kicolo
 Funda

Infrastructure 
It is served by a station on a branch line of the northern line of the national railway system.

The landing station for the Sat3 fibre optic sea cable is located here, operated by Angola Telecom.

See also 
 Railway stations in Angola

References

External links 
 "Marburg Transmission in Cacuaco - Slum Adjacent to Luanda" 6 April 2005

Municipalities in Luanda
Populated places in Luanda Province